The Central Navigation School was a training school of the Royal Air Force for air navigation.

History
It was formed on 14 August 1942 at RAF Cranage in Cheshire, north of Middlewich, formed out of No. 2 School of Air Navigation, in No. 25 Group RAF. It moved to RAF Shawbury on 11 February 1944. On 28 October 1944 it became known as the Empire Air Navigation School RAF, returning to the original name on 31 October 1949.

From 10 February 1950 to 11 February 1963, the school was known as the Central Navigation and Control School RAF, when the School of Air Traffic Control was added to it, in No. 21 Group RAF, rejoining 25 Group in 1955. From 1963, the Central Air Traffic Control School remained at RAF Shawbury.

References

1942 establishments in the United Kingdom
Air navigation
Education in Cheshire
Education in Shropshire
Educational institutions established in 1942
Military organizations established in 1942
Training establishments of the Royal Air Force